Daniel Greenwood ( – 29 January 1674) was an English clergyman and academic administrator at the University of Oxford.

Greenwood was the son of Richard Greenwood of Sowerby, North Yorkshire. He matriculated at Lincoln College, Oxford in 1624, aged 19, and graduated B.A. in 1627 (incorporated B.A. at Cambridge in 1632). He was appointed a Clifton Fellow of Brasenose College, Oxford in 1627, graduating M.A. 1629, B.D. 1641, D.D. 1649.

In 1637, Archbishop Laud instructed the Vice-Chancellor (Laud's nephew-in-law Richard Baylie) to keep an eye on Greenwood, whose Puritan preaching had come to Laud's attention:

In the church, Greenwood was Rector of Chastleton, Oxfordshire 1640–1662.

During the Parliamentary occupation of Oxford (Parliament had captured Oxford at the Siege of Oxford in 1646), Samuel Radcliffe, Principal of Brasenose College, refused to recognise the authority of the Parliamentary visitors, who issued an order expelling Radcliffe as Principal in January 1648, and appointed Greenwood as Principal on 29 February. On 13 April the Chancellor visited Brasenose to invest Greenwood with the office. Radcliffe, by then in terminal ill health, did not leave Brasenose, dying under house arrest on 26 June. In a process disrupted by Parliamentary soldiers, the Fellows then elected Thomas Yate in opposition to Greenwood. Yate and 12 other Fellows (out of 16 Fellows in total) were then expelled from their Fellowships.

Although a Parliamentary appointee, Greenwood was a good college administrator; under Greenwood, numbers at the College rose from 20 to 120. He was also Vice-Chancellor of Oxford University 1650–1652. His Vice-Chancellorship was renewed in 1651 by Oliver Cromwell as University Chancellor, Cromwell commending Greenwood's "ability and zeale for Reformation".

In 1660, both Greenwood and Yate presented their claims to the principalship, Yate stating that Greenwood had not taken the Principal's oath, Greenwood stating that Yate's election was not entered in the college register and did not follow the statutes. Yate prevailed, the college Visitor (the Bishop of Lincoln) ordering that Yate be reinstated as Principal.

Greenwood died at Steeple Aston on 29 January 1673/74, and was buried in the chancel of the church.

References

1600s births
1674 deaths
Alumni of Lincoln College, Oxford
Fellows of Brasenose College, Oxford
Principals of Brasenose College, Oxford
Vice-Chancellors of the University of Oxford